The siege of Tortosa was a siege of the city of Tortosa (then in the Principality of Catalonia) from 12 June to 8 July 1708 during the War of the Spanish Succession. It pitched a Franco-Spanish force of 28,000 under the Duke of Orleans and Antoni de Villarroel against a combined Catalan and British force of 5,140 infantry and 70 cavalry under Ignasi Minguella, Francesc Montagut and general Jones. It ended in the Franco-Spanish force conclusively taking the town and as a result ending the occupation of Valencia.

External links
http://www.11setembre1714.org/Unitats/coronela-tortosa-frame.html
http://www.spanishsuccession.nl/1708.html
http://www.british-history.ac.uk/cal-treasury-papers/vol4/pp69-82

Tortosa
1708 in Spain
Tortosa
Tortosa
Tortosa
Tortosa
Sieges of the War of the Spanish Succession
Tortosa